Paranormalized is the third album by Six Finger Satellite, released on August 6, 1996 through Sub Pop. It was marked by an almost complete reliance on synthesizers, in contrast to their earlier records, in which guitars still played a significant part.

The record was recorded at The Parlour, in Pawtucket, Rhode Island, less than a year after the release of Severe Exposure. Singer J. Ryan would later explain, "That record was put together pretty quick just as an attempt to get back on the road. Our touring for Severe Exposure had been pretty spotty."

Track listing

Personnel 
Six Finger Satellite
James Apt – bass guitar, clarinet
John MacLean – guitar, synthesizer, Moog synthesizer
Richard Ivan Pelletier – drums, drum machine
Jeremiah Ryan – vocals, Moog synthesizer
Additional musicians and production
Peter Goldberg – photography
John Golden – mastering
Jeff Kleinsmith – design
Nate Pellochoud – photography
Charles Peterson – photography
Six Finger Satellite – production, engineering, mixing

References

External links 
 

Six Finger Satellite albums
1998 albums
Sub Pop albums